Ralph Burton (d. 1768 in Scarborough, Yorkshire, England) was a British soldier and Canadian settler.

Burton's military career began in the 2nd Troop of Horse Grenadier Guards, where he rose to the rank of Major, serving under George Augustus Eliott, the defender of Gibraltar  In 1754, Burton was appointed Lieutenant Colonel of the 48th Foot, which was involved in the captures of Quebec in 1759 and of Martinique and Havanna in 1762. In 1760, General Jeffery Amherst, Governor General of British North America, appointed him lieutenant governor of the Trois-Rivières district while New France remained under British military rule.

On 31 January 1761, Burton formed the 95th Regiment of Foot in South Carolina from several independent companies. The regiment fought successfully against the Cherokees. It then transferred to Barbados. From there it participated in the capture of Martinique, the occupation of Grenada, and the siege of Havana (1762). The regiment was disbanded in England on 7 March 1763.

Following the return of civilian rule under the newly appointed Governor, General James Murray, Burton was made brigadier (commander) of the army in the new British province of Quebec. He was also made Colonel of the 3rd Foot (the Buffs).  After continual conflict with Governor Murray, both he and Burton were recalled to Britain in 1766.

Despite being an influential figure in Canadian military and geopolitical history, little is known about Burton's life outside of the Army. He appears to have been a close friend of John Calcraft, and was elected to Parliament a few months before his death as Member for Wareham, a pocket borough that Calcraft controlled.

He died in 1768. A 1767 will mentions an estate in Yorkshire, England and a townhouse in London. He was twice married: in 1750 to Elizabeth St Leger (died 1753), sister of Anthony St Leger after whom the famous horse race is named, then around 1763 to Marguerite Lydius. He had a son and a daughter by his second marriage. A daughter Mary, his eventual heir, married General Napier Christie, who adopted the surname Burton.

A memorial to Ralph Burton is in St. Mary's Church, Cottingham, East Riding of Yorkshire

References 

 Lewis Namier & John Brooke, The History of Parliament: The House of Commons 1754-1790 (London: HMSO, 1964)

External links 
Biography at the Dictionary of Canadian Biography Online

Year of birth missing
1768 deaths
People from Scarborough, North Yorkshire
British military personnel of the French and Indian War
British Army officers
British Life Guards officers
48th Regiment of Foot officers
British MPs 1768–1774
Members of the Parliament of Great Britain for English constituencies
Governors of Montreal
Buffs (Royal East Kent Regiment) officers
People from Cottingham, East Riding of Yorkshire
18th-century Canadian politicians